The 1992 World Series was the championship series of Major League Baseball's (MLB) 1992 season. The 89th edition of the World Series, it was a best-of-seven playoff played between the American League (AL) champion Toronto Blue Jays and the National League (NL) champion Atlanta Braves. Toronto defeated Atlanta four games to two, marking the first time a team based outside the United States won the World Series. The Blue Jays remain the only Canadian team to have appeared in, and won, a World Series (which they would do again the following year, in ). The 1992 World Series was the first World Series in which games were played outside the United States.

Background

The Blue Jays won the American League Eastern Division title for the second consecutive season and third time in four years. They faced the winners of the Western Division, the Oakland Athletics, in the American League Championship Series. The A's were looking to advance to the World Series for the fourth time in five years, having previously been in the World Series in 1988, 1989, and 1990, winning it in 1989. The Blue Jays, meanwhile, were looking to become the first Canadian team to win a pennant. The Blue Jays lost the first game at home but then won the next three to take a commanding lead, eventually closing the series out at home in Game 6.

The Braves won the National League Western Division for the second straight season and earned another matchup with the three-time defending Eastern Division winners, the Pittsburgh Pirates, in the National League Championship Series. The Braves won three of the first four games in the series, but the Pirates won the next two and were leading in the bottom of the ninth in Game 7 before the Braves rallied, capped off by a single by seldom-used utility man Francisco Cabrera that drove in two runs and won the series.

Summary

Matchups

Game 1

Braves fans had plenty to worry about in regard to both starting pitchers. Tom Glavine's post-season career had been less than stellar, including giving up eight runs in the second inning of Game 6 of the NLCS against Pittsburgh. Entering Game 1, Glavine's career post-season record was 1–5 despite two starts where he had pitched well and only given up one earned run each time. Glavine was 0–2 in those starts. In addition to Glavine's struggles in the postseason, the Braves would be facing their nemesis from the previous postseason. 

In the offseason, the Blue Jays signed the MVP of the 1991 World Series, Jack Morris, away from the Minnesota Twins. The Braves were more than familiar with Morris' work, as he had defeated them twice in three starts and only allowed a total of three runs. One of the victories came in the decisive seventh game, where Morris pitched a ten-inning complete game shutout. Morris' fortunes in 1992, however, were quite the opposite. Despite leading the Blue Jays with 21 wins in the regular season, Morris had not performed well in the postseason. He lost one of his two starts in the 1992 American League Championship Series despite throwing a complete game and took a no-decision in the other despite giving up five early runs.

Toronto's other big offensive acquisition had been veteran Dave Winfield, who entered his 20th season in 1992 having yet to win a World Series ring. Winfield, primarily just the team's designated hitter by this point, paid dividends by recording his best batting average and runs batted in numbers in several years and added two home runs in the ALCS. His presence in the lineup was one that manager Cito Gaston wanted to keep, which forced some maneuvering of the lineup for the games to be played in Atlanta under National League rules; Winfield's natural position was right field, which was manned by All-Star Joe Carter during the season. Therefore, for Game 1, Winfield was inserted into Carter's place in the outfield. Carter, in turn, played first base in place of normal starter John Olerud.

Glavine gave up a home run to Joe Carter in the fourth for the first run of the Series, while Morris shut the Braves out for five innings. In the sixth, Morris ran into trouble by walking David Justice and Ron Gant. Damon Berryhill golfed a Morris pitch over the right-field wall for a three-run homer. Morris would finish the inning, but it was all the offense Atlanta needed, and the Braves took the game by a 3–1 count. Glavine went the distance for the victory, only giving up four total hits. In taking the loss, Morris suffered his first career World Series defeat in his sixth start, with one no-decision. Berryhill's home run marked the first runs Morris had given up in the World Series since a Terry Pendleton home run in the bottom of the third inning of Game 4 of the 1991 Series. Morris pitched an additional  innings in that game, all ten in Game 7, and the first  innings of this game to run his scoreless innings streak in the World Series to 19.

Game 2

Before the game started, during the performance of the National Anthems of the United States and Canada, the U.S. Marine Corps Color Guard accidentally flew the flag of Canada upside down The Corps apologized for the error and took pains to carry the flag properly prior to Game 3 in Toronto after insisting that they would be honored to do so. Also, Canadian rock/country musician Tom Cochrane sang the Canadian national anthem incorrectly. Instead of singing the line "... from far and wide, O Canada, we stand on guard for thee ...", Cochrane instead sang a lyric that was in the previous version of the anthem: "... O Canada, we stand on guard, we stand on guard for thee ...". Not only did Cochrane substitute the archaic lyric, he also did not sing it correctly, as the lyric said "and stand on guard, O Canada, we stand on guard for thee" before it was changed.

The pitching match-up featured, strangely, the top two pitchers in the National League in strikeouts for 1992. On August 27, 1992, the Blue Jays traded rookie infielder Jeff Kent and minor league outfield prospect Ryan Thompson to the New York Mets for their ace starting pitcher, David Cone. At the time of the trade, Cone had been leading the National League in strikeouts and was looking to do so for a third consecutive season. Major League Baseball rules dictate that when a player changes leagues during a season, the statistics he earns in each league are kept separate from each other. As such, Cone's total of 214 strikeouts with the Mets was frozen. Smoltz eventually caught and passed Cone toward the end of the season, finishing with a total of 215 strikeouts to lead the league. Cone, meanwhile, settled for the overall major league lead at a career high 261 strikeouts after recording 47 with the Blue Jays.

As far as the postseason had gone to that point, both men's fortunes varied. Smoltz had started three games in the NLCS, winning two and being saved from a loss when the Braves made a two-out rally in the decisive final game; his performance was enough to make him the series MVP. Cone started the second and fifth games of the ALCS, winning his first start by allowing one run over eight innings. His second start saw him give up five runs (three unearned) over four innings, saddling him with the loss.

A controversial call was made by umpire Mike Reilly in the top of the fourth inning with Atlanta leading 1–0 after David Justice walked, stole second, advanced to third, and scored on a wild pitch from Cone in the bottom of the second. Roberto Alomar was at third base with John Olerud batting. On the first pitch of the at-bat, Smoltz threw a breaking ball that skipped past Damon Berryhill. Alomar broke for home plate while Berryhill went to retrieve the ball. As Smoltz moved in to receive the throw he nearly collided with a sliding Alomar, who had reached the plate at exactly the same time that both Smoltz and the ball did. Smoltz tagged Alomar and Reilly called him out on the close play, despite an angry Alomar's protest, and the inning came to an end. Replays shown by CBS showed that Alomar might have touched the plate with his hands before Smoltz was able to apply a tag. The Braves scored again in the bottom of the fourth, when Sid Bream walked and eventually scored on a Mark Lemke two-out single to make the score 2–0.

In the top of the fifth Pat Borders and Manuel Lee both reached base in front of Cone, who had already singled earlier in the game. Cone responded with his second hit of the game (only the third hit for a pitcher in the World Series since 1979) to drive in Borders and cut the Atlanta lead to 2–1. Lee then scored on a single by Devon White, tying the game. The Braves rallied in the bottom half of the inning as Deion Sanders provided a spark. With one out, Sanders singled. He then immediately stole second, and after Borders made an errant throw he got up and ran to third. Cone then walked Terry Pendleton, then gave up the go-ahead run when David Justice singled in Sanders and moved Pendleton to third. Blue Jays manager Cito Gaston then pulled Cone in favor of David Wells, who gave up the fourth Atlanta run (which would be charged to Cone, as the runner had reached base while Cone was pitching) when pinch hitter Brian Hunter's sacrifice fly scored Pendleton.

Toronto made another rally in the eighth inning. After Alomar doubled to left with one out, Joe Carter and Dave Winfield hit back to back singles, the second of which scored Alomar and cut the lead to 4–3. Smoltz was then lifted in favor of left-handed specialist Mike Stanton, who retired Olerud for the second out. 

The Braves then called on their own late season pitching acquisition. Needing to shore up their bullpen, Atlanta sent two minor leaguers to the Boston Red Sox at the August trade deadline to acquire Jeff Reardon, Boston’s closer who earlier in the season had broken Rollie Fingers’ career saves record. In his first appearance in a World Series since 1987, he struck out Kelly Gruber to end the threat.

The Jays entered the ninth trailing by the one run Reilly had cost them and turned to their bench, which the team had nicknamed "The Trenches". After a walk to pinch-hitter Derek Bell (batting for Lee), Toronto reserve infielder Ed Sprague Jr. drilled a pitch from Reardon to left for a two-run homer to give the Blue Jays the lead. The play was called by legendary Blue Jays announcer the late Tom Cheek, who said "Watch him hit a homer.", during Sprague's at bat.

Atlanta tried to rally in the ninth. After Mark Lemke flew out, Toronto closer Tom Henke hit pinch hitter Lonnie Smith with a pitch. Ron Gant came in to pinch run for him and, after Otis Nixon recorded the second out, he stole second. Sanders then walked to put the winning run on base and Pendleton, an NL MVP candidate, came to the plate. Pendleton had led the majors with a .391 average with runners in scoring position and two out. However, he popped out to Jays third baseman Kelly Gruber to seal the victory for Toronto. Gruber then angered Braves fans and players by mocking the "Tomahawk Chop" as he left the field.

Game 3

Before this game, the U.S. Marine Corps Color Guard offered to hoist the Canadian flag once more in order to make amends for the inverted flag incident of Game 2. Likewise, the Royal Canadian Mounted Police flew the flag of the United States. The two guards received a standing ovation from the Toronto fans.

As Game 3 moved across the border (for the first Canadian Classic) the question still remained of the Blue Jays' ballpark benefit. Before this series, the Blue Jays had previously only gone 3–6 in the postseason in their home park. Two of the wins, however, had come in the American League Championship Series as the Blue Jays won Game 2 and the clinching Game 6 against Oakland at home.
The starters for this game were Steve Avery for the Braves and Juan Guzman for the Blue Jays. 

In the fourth inning, the first big defensive play of the Series nearly resulted in a rare World Series triple play and another bit of World Series history was made. Deion Sanders and Terry Pendleton reached base to start the inning, and with nobody out David Justice hit a deep fly to center field. Devon White was able to chase down the ball and make a leap to snare it before crashing into the wall. 

Sanders and Pendleton, meanwhile, had stopped running to watch the play develop. In the confusion, Pendleton accidentally crossed in front of Sanders and by rule was automatically out. The ball was eventually relayed to third baseman Kelly Gruber as Sanders remained frozen between second and third. Gruber began chasing Sanders back toward second, and as Sanders attempted to slide back in Gruber made a last second lunging dive with his glove to try to tag him. Second base umpire Bob Davidson called Sanders safe, but Gruber maintained he had tagged Sanders on the heel just before he got back. The television replays seemed to confirm his side of the argument, as a reverse angle showed contact being made.

The Braves would not score that inning, as Guzman struck out Lonnie Smith to end it. The history making event followed as, with one out in the bottom of the fourth, Joe Carter hit a home run off of Avery. This resulted in not only the first run being scored in Canada during the World Series, but also the first home run being hit. 

With the Blue Jays still ahead entering the sixth inning, the Braves mounted a rally. With one out, Sanders doubled off of Guzman. Pendleton followed with a single to advance him to third, and Justice then added his own single to score Sanders and tie the game. Guzman recovered, however, and retired Smith and Sid Bream to leave the go-ahead run stranded at second. 

In the eighth, the Braves managed to take the lead. Otis Nixon led off and hit a line drive to the left side. Gruber was unable to field the ball cleanly, as it hit his glove and popped out, and thus the Braves had the go-ahead run on base. Nixon then stole second, putting himself in scoring position with nobody out. Guzman retired Sanders and Pendleton, but Nixon advanced to third on the latter’s groundout. With Justice due up, Blue Jays manager Cito Gaston decided to walk him intentionally and pitch to Smith. The decision backfired as Smith singled to score Nixon. Although Justice was thrown out trying to advance to third, the Braves had a 2-1 lead. 

With the Blue Jays coming to bat in the bottom half, Gruber received an immediate chance to make up for his gaffe in the field and in doing so, would erase a long hitless streak. After going hitless in the ALCS opener, Gruber had recorded a home run and a double in the second game, both of which led to runs that were necessary to win that game. Those had been the only two hits he had recorded to that point in the postseason, as he failed to record a hit in either the remaining four ALCS games or the first two games in the World Series and was 0-for-1 in this game with a walk in his previous at bat. After going 23 consecutive at-bats without recording a single hit, Gruber worked a full count on Avery and then drilled a home run into left field to tie the game. Gruber would only record one more hit in the series after this.

Duane Ward replaced Guzman for the top of the ninth and gave up a single to Bream. The sequence of events that followed resulted in something that had not occurred in a World Series in seven years. Bream was a notoriously slow baserunner throughout his career, and Braves manager Bobby Cox would often call for a pinch runner late in games for the veteran first baseman. At this time, Cox’s go-to was a young Brian Hunter, who had more speed and could be called upon to steal if necessary. 

Ward then faced shortstop Jeff Blauser and worked the count to an even 2-2. Cox then called for a steal, and on the next pitch Hunter took off. Blauser began to swing at the pitch and tried to check it as Pat Borders tried to catch Hunter stealing. Shortstop Manuel Lee fielded the throw and tagged out Hunter, then jumped up and told Borders to ask home plate umpire Joe West for an appeal of Blauser’s swing. First base umpire Dan Morrison ruled that Blauser had swung, giving Ward the strikeout and the second out of the inning. 

The call infuriated Cox, who was already frustrated with West’s strike zone behind the plate. In his anger, Cox picked up a nearby batting helmet and forcefully threw it down to the floor of the dugout. The helmet bounced off of the dugout floor and rolled onto the playing field, where West spotted it and ejected Cox from the game. It was the first time since Whitey Herzog in 1985 that a manager had been ejected from any World Series game. The inning ended without further incident as Ward struck out Damon Berryhill for the final out. 

Avery started the bottom of the ninth for the Braves and gave up a single to Roberto Alomar. Acting manager Jimy Williams (usually the team's third base coach) pulled Avery from the game and brought in hard-throwing Mark Wohlers to face Carter, a right-handed batter. CBS announcer Tim McCarver questioned the strategy, as Alomar was a threat to steal a base and Avery, as a left-handed pitcher, had a quicker pickoff move than the right-handed Wohlers. With Carter facing a 2-0 pitch, Alomar took off for second and beat Berryhill’s throw. The pitch did not find the strike zone, and with Wohlers now behind 3-0 to Carter he decided to put him on intentionally. 

Dave Winfield was the next batter and the double play possibility existed. However, Cito Gaston had told the veteran slugger that if Alomar and Carter had gotten on base ahead of him, he was going to call for a sacrifice bunt to move then into scoring position. This indeed proved the case, as Winfield dropped down a bunt that advanced the winning run to third with one out. 

John Olerud was due next, so Williams came back to the mound to bring in Mike Stanton, his left-handed specialist, to face
the Blue Jays’ first baseman. Gaston responded by sending up right-handed Ed Sprague Jr., whose home run in Game 2 won the game for Toronto, up to pinch hit to give the Blue Jays a more advantageous situation. Stanton instead was asked to put Sprague on with an intentional walk, which loaded the bases.

After another pitching change followed, the Braves got the matchup they wanted, with Jeff Reardon facing off against left fielder Candy Maldonado. Reardon had recorded a fair amount of success against Maldonado to this point in their careers, as he had faced him multiple times and only allowed three hits. To this, he started Maldonado out with two curveballs which resulted in strikes. Maldonado decided to wait and see if Reardon would throw it again, which he did; Maldonado drove the ball over a drawn-in outfield to bring home Alomar with the winning run and give the Blue Jays the lead in the series. Like Gruber after Game 2, Alomar celebrated by Tomahawk Chopping his way to home plate. 

Ward, the winner of Game 2, got his second victory of the series. The loss went to Avery as he was responsible for the lead runner (Alomar) on base when the game ended. Reardon would not pitch again in the series after his back to back poor performances, and would not pitch in a postseason game again in his career before his 1994 retirement.

Game 4

The Braves continued to employ the short rotation they had used during the postseason and sent Tom Glavine, the Game 1 winner, out for his second start of the series, bypassing 15-game-winner Charlie Leibrandt, who had only seen mop-up duty for Atlanta in Games 5 and 6 of the NLCS. For the Blue Jays, veteran Jimmy Key was given the start. Key had been with the Blue Jays since 1984 and was one of several players from their first ever division champion squad that were still with the team. However, he had not performed particularly well during the season and Cito Gaston had not included him in the ALCS rotation; Key only pitched in Toronto's Game 5 loss in relief.

The Braves began the game with a single off the bat of Otis Nixon, who was a threat to steal a base. Although Key managed to pick Nixon off of first, he immediately gave up a single to Jeff Blauser, hitting second in place of the resting Deion Sanders, and allowed him to steal second. Key neutralized the threat by forcing Terry Pendleton to line out and Lonnie Smith to ground out. Over the next six innings, the Braves only recorded one hit (another single by Nixon) and did not advance the runner past first base.

In the third inning, the Blue Jays scored their first run when Pat Borders hit a home run. They added a second run in the bottom of the seventh, which would prove decisive, when Kelly Gruber scored on a single by Devon White with two out.

The Braves broke through against Key in the eighth. Ron Gant, starting in place of Sanders, led off with a double. Brian Hunter, starting at first base in place of Sid Bream, followed by beating out a bunt down the third base line to put runners on the corners with nobody out. Key recorded back-to-back outs, retiring Damon Berryhill on a failed sacrifice bunt attempt that didn't advance the runners and getting Mark Lemke to ground out to third. On the Lemke play, Gant scored the Braves' first run of the game and with the tying run now in scoring position as Hunter advanced to second on the groundout, Key was removed from the game. On his way off the field, he tipped his cap to the fans as they gave him a standing ovation.

Duane Ward was brought in for his third consecutive appearance and his first batter was Nixon, who had recorded two of the Braves' hits. Although Ward got Nixon to strike out swinging, the third strike got past Borders and Nixon took off for first base, and being a speedy runner he was able to reach first safely, ahead of the throw. Nixon then stole second to put the go-ahead runs in scoring position, with Hunter having advanced to third on the wild pitch. Blauser, however, ended the inning by grounding out to Olerud. Tom Henke closed the game for the Blue Jays by retiring Pendleton, Smith, and David Justice in order in the ninth and Toronto found itself a win away from becoming the first world championship team from outside the United States. Tom Glavine would pitch another solid complete game, but his bad luck in the postseason continued and he was charged with a loss--the third time he had lost a post-season game despite turning in a very solid outing, previously losing a 1–0 game to Pittsburgh and a 3–2 game to Minnesota (in which two of the three runs were unearned) along with the 2–1 loss in this game. He would later add another hard-luck World Series loss four years later despite another stellar outing giving up one earned run and four hits in seven innings.  

In what proved to be his last start for the Blue Jays after nine years, Key recorded his first victory in the postseason since he won Game 3 of the 1989 ALCS.

Game 5

Down three games to one and facing elimination, the Braves returned John Smoltz to the mound for Game 5, who was still seeking his first World Series win after three previous solid starts all resulted in no decisions. Toronto countered by returning Jack Morris as starter, as he looked to atone for his postseason struggles and, for a second consecutive year, win the deciding game of the World Series.

Although Atlanta’s situation was dire, it was not impossible for them to come back as several teams in the past had done so. The most recent example had been in 1985, when the Kansas City Royals rallied from a 3-1 deficit to defeat the St. Louis Cardinals in seven games. In fact, Braves third baseman Terry Pendleton had been a member of that Cardinals team and met with his teammates before the game to remind them of the possibility that they might come back and win the series.

Entering the night, the middle of the Braves' lineup, which consisted that evening of Pendleton hitting third, David Justice fourth, and Lonnie Smith fifth, had been struggling with the rest of the team when it came to producing hits and scoring runs. In fact, none of the batters hitting in those three slots (Pendleton, Justice, Smith, or Sid Bream who had hit fifth in the first two games in Atlanta) had recorded an extra base hit. The Braves took care of that statistic quickly.

Otis Nixon led the game off for the Braves with a ground rule double due to fan interference. After Deion Sanders struck out, Nixon stole third as Pendleton batted. He then scored as Pendleton responded with a double of his own to right field, scoring the first run of the game and giving Justice a chance to drive in a runner in scoring position. Morris settled down, however, and retired Justice on a strikeout and Smith on a flyball to end the inning.

The Blue Jays tied the game in the bottom of the second. With one out, John Olerud singled and Candy Maldonado reached on a walk. Smoltz struck out Kelly Gruber for the second out, but Pat Borders responded with a double. The slow-footed Olerud was sent home on the play and the throw to the plate was wide, which enabled him to score and put Maldonado on third with the lead run. Manuel Lee ended the threat, however, by lining out to Pendleton.

The fourth inning saw the teams exchange runs again. In the visiting half, Justice led off with a home run for a 2–1 lead. Morris quickly retired Smith and Sid Bream, however, and Borders threw Jeff Blauser out stealing to keep the deficit at one. In the bottom half, Olerud and Maldonado reached base in front of Borders with one out, and as he had in the second inning he drove in Olerud with a single. But once again, the Blue Jays could not score the lead run as Lee grounded into a fielder's choice which forced Maldonado out at third and Smoltz struck Devon White out with Borders at second.

Morris started the fifth inning by striking out Damon Berryhill, whose home run in Game 1 saddled him with the loss, and forcing Mark Lemke to ground out. Nixon followed with his second hit of the game, then stole his second base of the game to put himself in scoring position. Sanders followed with a single to score Nixon, bringing Pendleton back to the plate. The third baseman followed with another ground rule double caused by fan interference. This forced Sanders, who had rounded third and was on his way to score the Braves' second run of the inning, to return to third base. 

However, the Braves now had two runners in scoring position instead of one and Justice, coming off his home run an inning earlier, was due up. With Toronto now behind by a run at 3-2 and with his ace in trouble, manager Cito Gaston decided that the best course of action was to do what he had done late in Game 3. He called for an intentional walk, which loaded the bases, and elected to have Morris pitch to the struggling Smith. 

Smith to this point in the series had only recorded one hit, coming after the aforementioned intentional walk to Justice two nights earlier and resulting in a run. Seeing the same strategic play angered the veteran Smith, who recalled that he felt insulted to be thought of in that way, believing they saw him as "an easy out" and would be able to escape the inning without further damage. 

Smith fouled the first pitch off, then took a ball to even the count. Morris got Smith to foul off the next pitch, leaving him one strike away from escaping the jam and leaving the Braves with the bases loaded. Smith, however, was determined to make the Blue Jays pay for disrespecting his ability and after he fouled off two more pitches, he deposited Morris' sixth pitch over the wall and into the Atlanta bullpen. The grand slam home run gave the Braves a five-run lead and Gaston finally removed his starter from the game. David Wells retired Bream to end the inning, with the Blue Jays trailing 7–2.

Smoltz pitched into the seventh inning giving up one hit afterward, a single to Dave Winfield in the bottom of the fifth. After walking Lee to lead off the seventh, he was pulled in favor of Mike Stanton, who got White to ground into a fielder's choice and then induced a double play from Roberto Alomar to end the threat. The Blue Jays only received one more baserunner the rest of the night as Joe Carter singled, stole second, then advanced to third on a sacrifice fly by Ed Sprague Jr. in the eighth inning but got nothing additional.

Meanwhile, the Toronto relief corps of Wells, Mike Timlin, and Mark Eichhorn managed to keep the Braves in check for the remainder of the game. Atlanta threatened one more time in the ninth with one out as Lemke, Nixon, and Sanders all reached base, but Todd Stottlemyre induced a fly ball out to Maldonado off the bat of Pendleton and Lemke was thrown out trying to score.

Smoltz took the win, his first ever World Series victory, with Stanton getting the save and Morris taking his second loss. Morris would not pitch another postseason game after this, with Smith being the last batter he would face in the postseason. With Smoltz and Morris earning the decisions, this was, to date, the last World Series game in which both the winning and losing pitcher were later inducted into the Hall of Fame until Game 7 of the 2001 World Series (Randy Johnson and Mariano Rivera were the pitchers of record).
 
Atlanta's offensive outburst ensured the series would return to the United States for at least one more game and dashed the Blue Jays' hopes of clinching the World Series at home on Canadian soil. The Braves would return home looking to force a second straight Game 7 of the World Series, and potentially supplant the 1985 Kansas City Royals as the most recent team to come back from 3-1 down to win the World Series.

Smoltz's win in Game 5 was the first of only two World Series wins he recorded in his Hall of Fame career. After recording three no decisions in as many starts (Games 4 and 7 in 1991 and Game 2 in this series), Smoltz would go another four years before winning another World Series game before winning Game 1 of the 1996 World Series. His overall record in World Series play was 2-2, despite a track record of seven quality starts out of eight. He lost Game 5 in 1996, 1-0 (the one run was unearned) and Game 4 in 1999. Smoltz's only other World Series start was in the 1995 World Series and this was his only poor start in a World Series, but this one also resulted in a no decision in Game 3 after the Braves rallied to force extra innings.

Morris, meanwhile, continued his struggles in the 1992 postseason. In four total appearances, Morris allowed a total of 19 runs and went 0–3 with an ERA above 7.00. In the World Series alone, his ERA was 8.44, over seven runs higher than his performance the year before when he recorded a 1.17 ERA. Game 5 would be his last postseason appearance for his career; Morris was injured toward the end of the following season and did not pitch in the postseason. He would retire from baseball in 1995.

Smith's grand slam was the first in a World Series since 1988, when Jose Canseco hit one in the Oakland Athletics' eventual 5–4 loss to the Los Angeles Dodgers. Smith became the first player to hit one for the winning team since Kent Hrbek did so in Game 6 of the 1987 World Series for the Minnesota Twins, and was the last for a player on the visiting team until Addison Russell did so in Game 6 of the 2016 World Series for the Chicago Cubs.

Game 6

The Braves returned home for Game 6 having managed to stave off elimination, but still faced a must win matchup against the Blue Jays as they tried to clinch the series for the second straight game. 

The Braves’ short rotation for the series saw Game 3 loser Steve Avery return to the mound for Game 6. Toronto brought back its Game 2 starter, David Cone, who had avoided the loss thanks to the Blue Jays’ late rally. The Blue Jays again played Dave Winfield in right field to keep his bat in the lineup, with Cito Gaston electing to play Joe Carter at first base instead of John Olerud as he had in Game 1. 

The Blue Jays opened the scoring in the top of the first. Devon White led off with a single, then stole second base. He advanced to third on a groundout by Roberto Alomar, and Carter followed with a fly ball to right that David Justice could not field cleanly. White scored and Carter ended up on second. Avery then walked Winfield and got Candy Maldonado to hit a ground ball to the left side. The Braves only managed to get Winfield out, as Carter advanced to third. A Kelly Gruber groundout ended the inning, stranding Carter ninety feet from home.

The first scoring chance for the Braves came in the second. After Sid Bream drew a walk to lead off the inning, Jeff Blauser followed with a single. Damon Berryhill then flew out to White, with the fly ball deep enough to allow the slow-footed Bream to reach third. Cone retired Mark Lemke on a fly out, then struck out Avery to end the threat and keep the Braves off the scoreboard. 

In the third, the Blue Jays again had a chance to score but did not take advantage. With one out, Alomar singled and stole second. Carter grounded out to Bream, which advanced Alomar to third. But as in the first, Avery got out of trouble as Winfield flew out to end the inning. In the home half of the inning, Atlanta managed to tie the game. A one out double by Deion Sanders was followed by him stealing third, and Terry Pendleton scored Sanders on a sacrifice fly to tie the score.

Toronto went back to work in the fourth. Maldonado led off with a home run, and with one out Pat Borders doubled. After Avery struck out Manuel Lee, he walked Cone to keep the inning going. White followed with a single and Borders attempted to score from second. The throw from  Sanders beat him to the plate, however, and the Blue Jays only managed the one run. Avery left the game after the inning.

After the Braves went down in order in the bottom of the fourth, the Blue Jays had another chance to add to the lead as Carter doubled off of Pete Smith in the top of the fifth. Again, they left him in scoring position as Smith got Winfield and Maldonado out. The Braves tried to rally against Cone in the last half of the inning, with Lemke drawing a walk to start. Cone got the next two outs, but Sanders singled and stole second to put the go-ahead run in scoring position. Pendleton, however, struck out to end the frame. 

After neither team got a runner past first base in the sixth or seventh innings, the Blue Jays tried again to score an insurance run in the eighth. Mike Stanton gave up a single to Maldonado, who advanced on a sacrifice bunt by Gruber. Borders was then walked intentionally, and Lee popped out for the second out. Stanton then got pinch hitter Derek Bell to ground out, leaving the Blue Jays with another runner stranded in scoring position. Stanton came back out for the ninth, but after he gave up a double to Carter, Mark Wohlers entered the game and retired Winfield. The Braves bullpen had pitched five scoreless innings to keep the score at 2-1 entering the bottom of the ninth, where they would need to score at least one run to keep their season alive. 

To this point in the postseason, the Blue Jays’ bullpen had gone 77 straight postseason innings without allowing a run. Closer Tom Henke had converted all five of his save opportunities across the ALCS and World Series, having already recorded saves in Game 2 and Game 4. With the Blue Jays three outs away from baseball history, and the bottom of the Braves order due up, Gaston sent Henke out for the home half of the ninth to lock down the championship. Blauser led off with a single to put the tying run on base. With Berryhill batting next, Braves manager Bobby Cox called for a sacrifice bunt. Berryhill, who had not successfully executed a sacrifice opportunity in the regular season and had been 0-for-1 in the series, did so here and advanced Blauser to second with the first out.

For the next two batters, Cox went to his bench for two of his postseason heroes. He sent up Game 5 hero Lonnie Smith to pinch hit for Lemke, and after getting behind two strikes he forced Henke to walk him. The winning runs were now on base, and with the pitcher's spot due Cox called on Francisco Cabrera, whose pinch hit single in Game 7 of the NLCS got the Braves to the World Series, to make his first appearance of the series. With the count at 2-2, Cabrera hit a rising line drive to left that Maldonado, who had been playing closer to the infield, lost sight of and had to leap to catch for the second out.

Otis Nixon then stepped to the plate with the Braves one out away from a second consecutive World Series defeat, needing a hit to extend the game. Down to his final strike, Nixon lined a single to left field. Maldonado fielded the ball as Blauser rounded third, but made a wild throw that sailed over Borders and into the netting behind the backstop. Blauser scored and Smith and Nixon advanced a base on the error. Ron Gant, who had replaced Sanders earlier when he left the game due to an injury, came up with a chance to win the game with a hit, but Henke retired him on a fly ball to end the inning and keep the score tied. 

The tenth inning began with veteran Braves starter Charlie Leibrandt, who as mentioned had only seen spot action during the postseason and had not yet pitched in the series, facing the middle of the Blue Jays' lineup. He retired Maldonado to start the inning, and then after he gave up a single to Gruber he set down Borders on a fly ball and Pat Tabler on a line drive back to the mound. After Henke started the home  half of the tenth by getting Pendleton to ground out to Carter at first,  Gaston brought in Game 4 winner Jimmy Key to face the left-handed Justice and Bream. Key managed to get both batters to ground out, bringing the game to the eleventh inning even at 2.

After he retired Key to start the eleventh, Leibrandt was then a strike away from retiring White. However, on the fourth pitch of the at-bat he hit White and put the go-ahead run on base. Alomar followed with a single, bringing Carter to the plate with White now in scoring position. On the CBS broadcast, Tim McCarver opined that Cox should bring in the righthanded Jeff Reardon, who was warmed up in the bullpen, to face Carter. However, Reardon had not pitched since his Game 3 performance that cost the Braves the win; in any event, Cox stuck with the veteran Leibrandt and he got the second out with a fly ball to Nixon. 

Winfield, to this point hitless in four at bats, was the next batter. He had not hit well in the series to this point, and had also struggled in his only other appearance in the World Series, hitting just .045 for the Yankees in 1981. However, he had faced Leibrandt many times when he pitched for the Kansas City Royals in the 1980s and had recorded a .302 batting average against him with four home runs. 

On the sixth pitch of the at-bat, Winfield connected on a line drive down the left-field line. White scored from second, and after the ball took a bad hop off the left-field corner and skipped away from Gant, Alomar scored without a play. It was Winfield's first career World Series extra-base hit. Leibrandt retired Maldonado to end the inning, but as he had done in Game 6 of the 1991 World Series, he surrendered a run-scoring extra-base hit to give the opposing team the lead; in 1991, he allowed a walk-off home run by Kirby Puckett to force Game 7. It was also the last time Leibrandt pitched for the Braves; he would retire after spending 1993 with the Texas Rangers.

With a two-run lead, Gaston stuck with Key. Blauser, as he had done in the ninth inning, led off with a single. On the next pitch, Berryhill hit a ground ball to short that appeared to be an easy double-play ball. However, the ball took a strange hop and handcuffed surehanded veteran shortstop Alfredo Griffin, who had entered the game in the tenth as a replacement for Lee. Blauser advanced to third on the error, and Cox sent in pitcher John Smoltz to run for the slow-footed Berryhill. Light-hitting Rafael Belliard, who had taken Lemke's place in the field and in the lineup, stepped in to take his first at-bat and Cox called for a sacrifice to move Smoltz into scoring position. With one out and the tying runs now both in scoring position, Brian Hunter pinch-hit for Leibrandt. Key forced him to ground out to Carter at first, but Blauser scored. The Braves were now in the same position as they had experienced two innings earlier: tying run on base, two outs and Nixon batting.

Gaston took the field to discuss defensive strategy with his infielders, concerned with the speedy Nixon's ability to reach base on a drag bunt. Gaston brought in Mike Timlin for his second series appearance, which confused McCarver and his broadcast partner Sean McDonough, who believed that Key was remaining in the game. The right-handed Timlin forced switch-hitter Nixon to hit from the left, his weaker side. (He had batted .343 right handed during the season, but only .263 left-handed.) But at the same time, the switch also gave the fleet-footed Nixon a shorter run to first base since the left-handed batter's box is located closer to the first base bag than the right-handed box, giving Nixon a faster jump toward first if he bunted. Carter advised Timlin that the bunt was a possibility, telling him to "be careful." Nixon did indeed lay down a bunt, but Timlin was able to field the ball quickly and throw to Carter at first in time to clinch the series for the Blue Jays.

Blue Jays manager Cito Gaston became the first African American manager to win a World Series.

American League president Dr. Bobby Brown presented the World Series Trophy in the place of the commissioner. Just a month earlier, Fay Vincent was forced to resign and was replaced by Bud Selig on what was originally perceived to be an "interim basis." Dr. Brown also presented the Blue Jays the trophy in 1993. The last World Series not to be presided over by a commissioner had taken place in 1919. Selig officially became commissioner of baseball in 1998.

The victory marked the first world championship for the city of Toronto since the National Hockey League's Toronto Maple Leafs won the 1967 Stanley Cup Finals.

Composite box
1992 World Series (4–2): Toronto Blue Jays (A.L.) over Atlanta Braves (N.L.)

This World Series is notable for being one of the few six-game series in which the winning team was outscored. It happened previously in 1918, 1959, and 1977; later in 1996 and 2003. Seven-game winners were outscored in 1957, 1960, 1962, 1964, 1971, 1972, 1973, 1975, 1991, 1997, and 2002; (equaled in 2016 and 2017).

The Blue Jays became the fourth World Series champion where each of their wins in the Series was by the margin of one run. This also happened in 1915, 1918 and 1972.

Broadcasting
At 30 years of age, CBS' Sean McDonough became the youngest man to call all nine innings and games of a World Series (while serving as a full network television employee). Although Vin Scully and Al Michaels were several years younger when they called their first World Series (1955 and 1972 respectively), they were products of the then broadcasting policy of announcers representing the participating teams (a process that ended following the 1976 World Series). McDonough's record would subsequently be broken by Fox's Joe Buck, who at 27 years of age, called the 1996 World Series. Coincidentally, it was Joe Buck's father, Jack, that McDonough had replaced as CBS's lead play-by-play man. Serving as field reporters for CBS's coverage were Jim Kaat (in the Braves' dugout) and Lesley Visser (in the Blue Jays' dugout). The Series drew an overall Nielsen rating of 20.2, down from the previous year's 24.0 but higher than that of any subsequent World Series.

CBS Radio also broadcast the Series nationally, with Vin Scully and Johnny Bench announcing. Locally, the Series was called on WGST-AM in Atlanta by Skip Caray, Pete Van Wieren, Ernie Johnson, Joe Simpson, and Don Sutton, and on CJCL-AM in Toronto by Jerry Howarth and Tom Cheek.

Notes

See also
1992 Japan Series

References

External links

1992 NLCS|Game 7 and World Series memories from MLB.com
1992 Toronto Blue Jays and 1992 Atlanta Braves at baseballlibrary.com

1992 World Series
World Series
Toronto Blue Jays postseason
Atlanta Braves postseason
History of Canada (1982–1992)
World Series
World Series
1992 in Atlanta
1992 in Toronto
October 1992 sports events in North America
Baseball competitions in Atlanta
Baseball competitions in Toronto